Adipokinetic hormones (AKHs) are metabolic neuropeptides, mediating mobilization of energy substrates in many insects.

History 
An English group first purified AKH in 1976. The chemical structure was determined to be a peptide hormone formed from 10 amino acids. This was the first insect peptide hormone to be identified. After AKH was identified in cockroaches, locust AKH was inserted into a cockroach. A similar increase in lipid mobilization was observed. Conversely, cockroach AKH led to similar activity within a locust.
AKH was initially discovered in the locusts Locusta migratoria and Schistocerca gregaria. It is generally associated with aiding flight. Lipids are transported from the hemolymph and metabolized by flight muscle in order to maintain flight. However, a high concentration of lipids remains in the hemolymph, implying that an agent may be responsible for activating lipid transport into the hemolymph. This was thought most likely to be a function of hormonal regulation. The hormone itself is part of a larger family, often referred to as red pigment concentrating hormones (RPCH) discovered in crustaceans.

Sequence
The typical makeup of hormones in this family includes a length between 8 and 10 amino acids, blocked N and C termini, with phenylalanine or tyrosine at position 4. AKH sequence characteristics also include tryptophane at position 8 and in more than half of the known AKHs, proline at position 6. Mass spectrometry is increasingly used for de novo sequencing of these hormones.

Significance 
AKH has become an important area of study, particularly in insect crop pests and insects that act as intermediate or vector hosts for parasites that can affect humans or animals. In experiments where locusts were injected with AKH and lipopolysaccharide (LPS–an immune elicitor found in the cell walls of bacteria) a stronger immune response was observed than in locusts that only received an LPS injection.
The spread of malaria by the female mosquito, Anopheles gambiae, is partly dependent on the adipokinetic hormone, Anoga-HrTH (pGlu-Leu-Thr-Phe-Thr-Pro-Ala-Trp-NH2). No crystal structure of this important neuropeptide is available. The NMR restrained molecular dynamic was used to investigate its conformational space in aqueous solution and when bound to a membrane surface. The results showed that Anoga-HrTH has an almost cyclic conformation that is stabilized by a hydrogen bond between the C-terminus and Thr3. When the agonist docks to its receptor, this H-bond is broken and the molecule adopts a more extended structure. Preliminary AKHR docking calculations give the free energy of binding to be −47.30 kJ/mol. Information about the 3D structure and binding mode of Anoga-HrTH to its receptor are vital for the design of suitable mimetics which can act as insecticides.

Literature 
AKH: A hormone for all seasons?

References

Insect hormones